Fredson is a given name and surname. Notable people with the name include:

Fredson (footballer, born 1981), full name Fredson Câmara Pereira, Brazilian footballer
Fredson (footballer, born 1991), full name Fredson Vinícius Santos Oliveira, Brazilian footballer
Fredson Paixão (born 1979), Brazilian martial artist
Fredson Rodrigues (born 1988), Cape Verdean footballer
John Fredson (1896–1945), Alaskan tribal leader

See also
Fred (disambiguation)